Lennox Mountain is an  mountain summit located in King County of Washington state. Lennox mountain extends a ridge South towards Canoe peak making a bowl structure where Lake Kanim sits, the origin source of the North Fork of the Snoqualmie River. From Lennox Mountain a second ridge with rocky double cliffs is formed running East towards Coney's Cones-South Peak where the Coney Basin and Coney Lake sit which produces a tributary of the west fork of Miller River. Access to Lennox Mountain is from Bare Mountain trailhead which reaches Canoe Peak.

See also

List of peaks of the Alpine Lakes Wilderness

References

Mountains of Washington (state)
Mountains of King County, Washington
Cascade Range
North American 1000 m summits